The Benin national basketball team is the national basketball team representing Benin in international competitions. It is administrated by the Fédération Béninoise de Basketball (FBB).

Benin had its best performance at the 1974 FIBA Africa Championship when it finished in Africa's Top Ten, ahead of Somalia.

Roster
Team for the AfroBasket 2015 qualification.

Competitive record
Benin has never played any games in the Olympics, FIBA Basketball World Cup or African Games.

FIBA Africa Championship

Head coaches
 Brigitte Affidehome Tonon: (2017)

See also
Benin national under-19 basketball team
Benin national under-17 basketball team

References

External links
Official website 
Benin Basketball Records at FIBA Archive

Men's national basketball teams
basketball
Basketball in Benin
1962 establishments in the Republic of Dahomey